Courage for Every Day is a 1964 Czechoslovak drama film directed by Evald Schorm.

Plot
Director Evald Schorm reflects on the changing political tides of his generation in this clear-eyed study of idealism and disillusionment. Jarda (Jan Kačer) is a passionate Communist worker fervently dedicated to the principles of his party. But as those around him grow increasingly disenchanted with the cause, he must confront a sobering realization: that everything he has fought for has been for nothing.

Cast
 Jana Brejchová as Věra
 Jan Kačer as Jarda Lukáš
 Josef Abrhám as Bořek
 Vlastimil Brodský as Journalist
 Jiřina Jirásková as Olina, journalist's wife
 Olga Scheinpflugová as Landlady
 Václav Trégl as Eduard Mrázek
 Jan Libíček as Photographer
 Jan Cmíral as Company director
 Josef Krameš as Magician
 Helena Uhlířová as Magician's assistant
 Jiří Menzel as Jarda's colleague

Reception

Awards
1966 Locarno International Film Festival
 Won: Golden Leopard

References

External links
 

1964 films
1964 drama films
Czechoslovak black-and-white films
Films directed by Evald Schorm
Golden Leopard winners
Czech drama films
Golden Kingfisher winners
1965 drama films
1965 films
1960s Czech films
Czechoslovak drama films
Czech black-and-white films